Richard Shepard (born 1965) is an American film and television director and screenwriter.

Biography
Shepard was born in New York City, New York. Shepard's father was from an Austro-Hungarian-Jewish background and his mother was of Armenian descent.

In 2007, Shepard received a Directors Guild of America Award and an Emmy Award for Outstanding Directing for the television pilot for Ugly Betty. Shepard's next film, The Perfection, was financed by Miramax, and started its production in early 2018. It was released in 2019 by Netflix.

Filmography
Film

Television

References

External links

eFilmCritic.com Interview with director Richard Shepard on the John Cazale Documentary "I Knew It Was You"
Richard Shepard Interview on Scripts & Scribes

1965 births
American male screenwriters
American television directors
Primetime Emmy Award winners
Living people
Writers from New York City
Directors Guild of America Award winners
American people of Armenian descent
American people of Austrian-Jewish descent
American people of Hungarian-Jewish descent
Film directors from New York City
Screenwriters from New York (state)